Ben Graham may refer to:

 Ben Graham (football player) (born 1973), Australian rules football player and American football punter
 Benjamin Graham (1894–1976), the "father of value investing"
 Benjamin S. Graham (1900–1960), the "father of Paperwork Simplification" creator of the first business process mapping (flowcharting) methodology